Ganlu Temple is a Buddhist temple located on Mount Jiuhua, in Qingyang County, Anhui, China.

Name
The name of "Ganlu" derives from Lotus Sutra.

History
The temple was originally built by an exceptional Chan master Dong'an in 1667, after Kangxi Emperor (1662–1722) ascended the throne during the Qing dynasty (1644–1911). The temple had reached unprecedented heyday in the reign of Qianlong Emperor (1736–1795) while abbot Youtan preached Buddhism here.

Ganlu Temple has been inscribed as a National Key Buddhist Temple in Han Chinese Area by the State Council of China in 1983.

Architecture
Now the existing main buildings include Mahavira Hall, Bell tower, Drum tower, and ring-rooms.

References

Bibliography
 

Buddhist temples on Mount Jiuhua
Buildings and structures in Chizhou
Tourist attractions in Chizhou
17th-century establishments in China
17th-century Buddhist temples
Religious buildings and structures completed in 1667